The Otoe are a Native American people of the Midwestern United States.

Otoe may also refer to:
Otoe-Missouria Tribe of Indians, a federally recognized tribe in Oklahoma
Otoe language
Otoe, Nebraska
Otoe County, Nebraska
Otoe City, Nebraska, another name for the railroad town of Minersville, Nebraska
A name for Taro used in Panama

See also
 Oto (disambiguation)